Coleophora psychropa is a moth of the family Coleophoridae. It is found in Kenya.

References

psychropa
Moths of Africa
Moths described in 1920